Oak Grove Township is one of eleven townships in Benton County, Indiana. As of the 2020 census, its population was 1,551 and it contained 690 housing units. It was one of the first three townships originally created by the county's commissioners in 1840.  It takes its name from White Oak Grove which grew southwest of Oxford.

Geography

Cities and towns
 Oxford

Unincorporated towns
 Fargo

Adjacent townships
 Bolivar (east)
 Center (north)
 Grant (west)
 Pine (northeast)
 Adams Township, Warren County (southeast)
 Pine Township, Warren County (southwest)

Major highways
  U.S. Route 52
  Indiana State Road 55
  Indiana State Road 352

Cemeteries
The township contains two cemeteries: Justus and Oxford.

References

Citations

Sources
 United States Census Bureau cartographic boundary files
 U.S. Board on Geographic Names

External links

 Indiana Township Association
 United Township Association of Indiana

Townships in Benton County, Indiana
Lafayette metropolitan area, Indiana
Townships in Indiana